Jalen Elliott (born July 7, 1998) is an American football safety for the Las Vegas Raiders of the National Football League (NFL). He played college football at Notre Dame. He previously played for the Detroit Lions and New England Patriots.

College career
Elliott played college football at Notre Dame from 2016 to 2019. He was named a captain for Notre Dame during his senior year in 2019.

Professional career

Detroit Lions
On May 1, 2020, Elliott signed with the Detroit Lions as an undrafted free agent after the 2020 NFL Draft. On September 5, 2020, he was released by the Lions.

On September 1, 2021, the Lions signed Elliott to the practice squad. On October 23, 2021, he was activated from the practice squad by the Lions for the team's week 7 game against the Los Angeles Rams. He was signed to the active roster on November 9.

On May 12, 2022, the Lions waived Elliott to make room for their rookie class.

New England Patriots
On August 2, 2022, Elliott signed with the New England Patriots. He was waived on August 20.

Las Vegas Raiders
On November 9, 2022, Elliott was signed to the practice squad of the Las Vegas Raiders. He signed a reserve/future contract on January 9, 2023.

References

1998 births
Living people
American football safeties
Detroit Lions players
Las Vegas Raiders players
New England Patriots players
Notre Dame Fighting Irish football players
Players of American football from Richmond, Virginia